McGirk is a ghost town located in Hamilton County near the Lampasas River in Central Texas. Founded in the early 1870s, the town acquired a post office in 1882. John A. McGirk, the town's namesake also served as the first postmaster. A steam-operated cotton gin on the Lampasas River remained in place for many years. The post office closed by 1920 and the school was gone by the mid-1930s. The town still had a population of 25 in 1945 but post war opportunities drew off that meager number and the town became a ghost.

"There is only a little bit of  information on this old town. The only thing that is left of it is an old cemetery and a school foundation off in the brush, that you wouldn't even notice if you didn't know it was there. This town was located on 1047 right on the Lampasas river between FM 2005 and Star at the far end of Hamilton county. From what I have gathered there once was a gas station and a whole community there. Now it is just a few farms and that old cemetery on the far corner of J. H. Joiner's (my grandfather) ranch." - Cody Morris, February 25, 2007

References
McGirk, Texas, Handbook of Texas Online, University of Texas at Austin
McGirk Cemetery, map

Ghost towns in Central Texas
Geography of Hamilton County, Texas